(–)-β-Caryophyllene synthase (EC 4.2.3.57, β-caryophyllene synthase) is an enzyme with systematic name (2E,6E)-farnesyl-diphosphate diphosphate-lyase ((–)-β-caryophyllene-forming). This enzyme catalyses the following chemical reaction

 (2E,6E)-farnesyl diphosphate  (–)-β-caryophyllene + diphosphate

This enzyme is widely distributed in higher plants.

References

External links 
 

EC 4.2.3